Mansoa hymenaea is a species of liana in the family Bignoniaceae. It is native to Mexico through South America.

References

Flora of Mexico
Flora of northern South America
hymenaea
Vines